Hemimyzon pengi is a species of ray-finned fish in the genus Hemimyzon. Hemimyzon pengi is a freshwater fish, mainly found in China.

Footnotes 

Hemimyzon
Fish described in 1982